This is a list of Pacific Tigers football players in the NFL Draft.

Key

Selections

Notes
Kirby Warren was selected in the 1984 Supplemental Draft.

References

Pacific

Pacific Tigers NFL Draft